The Little Churchill River is a river in the Hudson Bay drainage basin in Northern Manitoba, Canada. It flows from Waskaiowaka Lake to the Churchill River.

The Little Churchill River/Dunlop's Fly In Lodge Aerodrome is located on Waskaiowaka Lake at the point where the Little Churchill River leaves the lake.

See also
List of rivers of Manitoba

References

Rivers of Northern Manitoba
Tributaries of Hudson Bay